The eastern lowland olingo (Bassaricyon alleni) is a species of olingo from South America, where it is known from the lowlands east of the Andes in Bolivia, Brazil, Colombia, Ecuador, Guyana, Peru and Venezuela. It is the only olingo species found east of the Andes. The Latin species name honors Joel Asaph Allen, the American zoologist who first described the genus Bassaricyon.

Description
The eastern lowland olingo is smaller than the northern olingo, but larger than the recently described olinguito ("little olingo"), the most montane member of the genus. It is larger than the western lowland olingo subspecies B. medius medius from west of the Andes, but about the same size as the B. m. orinomus subspecies from eastern Panama. The pelage is slightly darker than the western species.

It weighs .

Taxonomy
The closest relative of the eastern lowland olingo is the western lowland species, B. medius, from which it diverged about 1.3 million years ago.

Notes

Procyonidae
Carnivorans of South America
Fauna of the Amazon
Mammals of Bolivia
Mammals of Brazil
Mammals of Colombia
Mammals of Ecuador
Mammals of Peru
Mammals of Venezuela
Mammals described in 1880
Least concern biota of South America
Taxa named by Oldfield Thomas